Marie-Claire Blais  (5 October 1939 – 30 November 2021) was a Canadian writer, novelist, poet, and playwright from the province of Québec. In a career spanning seventy years, she wrote novels, plays, collections of poetry and fiction, newspaper articles, radio dramas, and scripts for television. She was a four-time recipient of the Governor General’s literary prize for French-Canadian literature, and was also a recipient of the Guggenheim Fellowship for creative arts.

Some of her works included La Belle Bête (1959), The Manuscripts of Pauline Archange (1968), Deaf to the City (1979), and a ten-volume series Soifs written between 1995 and 2018.

Early life 
Blais was born on 5 October 1939 into a blue collar family in Québec, the daughter of Fernando and Véronique (Nolin) Blais. She was the eldest in a family of five children. She studied at a convent school, but had to interrupt her education at the age of 15 to seek employment as a clerk and later as a typist. At the age of seventeen, she enrolled in a few classes at Université Laval, where she met professor and literary critic Jeanne Lapointe and priest and sociologist Georges-Henri Lévesque, both of whom encouraged her to write.

Career 
Blais published her first novel La Belle Bête (translated as Mad Shadows) in 1959, when she turned 20. She received a grant from the Canada Council of Arts which allowed her to begin writing full-time. She first moved to Paris and later moved to the United States in 1963 initially living in Cambridge, Massachusetts, then in Wellfleet, Massachusetts. She was also helped by American literary critic Edmund Wilson who introduced her to artists and writers in Cape Cod including feminist Barbara Deming and writer and painter Mary Meigs. The three lived together in Wellfleet for six years. Blais remained a longtime partner of Mary Meigs until Meigs' death in 2002.

During this time, Blais was awarded two Guggenheim Fellowships. In 1975, after two years of living in Brittany, France, she moved back to Québec. For about twenty years she divided her time between Montréal, the Eastern Townships of Québec and Key West, Florida, where she maintained her permanent home.

In 1972, she became a Companion of the Order of Canada. Many of her works have been adapted for other formats: La belle bête was made into a ballet by the National Ballet of Canada in 1977. The same book was made into a movie by Karim Hussain in 1976. Hussain won the Director's Award at the Boston Underground Film Festival for his work. Some of Blais' other works that were made into movies included Une saison dans la vie d'Emmanuel (Claude Weisz, 1973), which won the Prix de la Quinzaine des jeunes réalisateurs at the Cannes Film Festival, Le sourd dans la ville (Mireille Dansereau, 1987), which won an award at the Venice Film Festival, and L'océan (Jean Feuchère, 1971).

Blais won the Governor General's Prize in Canada for two of her novels, The Manuscripts of Pauline Archange (1968) and Deaf to the City (1979). She also wrote a 10-volume series starting with Soifs (1995) translated into English as These Festive Islands. The series was set in an island town modeled on Key West and featured an interlocked cast of over a hundred characters including drag queens, painters, writers, and barflies, many of them based on acquaintances that she had made on the island where she had been a part of a community that included a journalist and novelist John Hersey and poet James Merrill. The writing was based on long sentences described as 'meandering' with a combination rapidly shifting between characters' internal monologues and dialogues. The books were written in a 'stream-of-consciousness' style, with no chapters and no paragraph breaks. The last book in the 10-volume series Une réunion près de la mer  was published in 2018.

She sponsored the  starting in 2005; awarded annually to a French author for their debut novel.

Blais enjoyed an ardent readership in French language literature and had won four Governor General's Literary Awards through her career. Writing in an article in Canadian newspaper The Globe and Mail, literary critic Jade Colbert called her "the 21st century Virginia Woolf" while Quebec novelist Michel Tremblay called her "one of our greatest national treasures".

In addition to her novels, Blais has written several plays, collections of poetry and fiction, newspaper articles, radio dramas, and scripts for television. Her works had characters that included delinquent children, wayward nuns and abusive priests and included issues like white supremacy, nuclear holocaust, and the AIDS epidemic. Her books included suffering as recurring themes, though she herself had noted in an interview that she preferred serenity to suffering.

Personal life 
Blais was a longtime partner of American writer and painter Mary Meigs. Meigs predeceased her in 2002.

Blais died 30 November 2021, in Key West, Florida.

Works 
Source:

 La Belle Bête (Mad Shadows) – 1959
 Tête blanche (White Head) – 1960
 Le jour est noir – ("The Day is Dark" in The Day is Dark and Three Travellers) 1962
 Pays voilés ("Veiled Countries" in Veiled Countries/Lives) – 1963
 Une saison dans la vie d'Emmanuel (A Season in the Life of Emmanuel) – 1965
 L'insoumise (The Fugitive) – 1966
 Les voyageurs sacrés ("Three Travellers" in The Day is Dark and Three Travellers) – 1966
 Existences ("Lives" in Veiled Countries/Lives) – 1967
 Les manuscrits de Pauline Archange (The Manuscripts of Pauline Archange) – 1968
 L'exécution (The Execution) – 1968
 Vivre! Vivre! (The Manuscripts of Pauline Archange) – 1969
 Les apparences (Dürer's Angel) – 1970
 Le loup (The Wolf) – 1972
 Un Joualonais, sa Joualonie (St. Lawrence Blues) – 1973
 Fièvre et autres textes dramatiques – 1974
 Une liaison parisienne (A Literary Affair) – 1975
 Océan suivi de murmures – 1977
 Les nuits de l'underground (Nights in the Underground) – 1978
 Le sourd dans la ville (Deaf to the City) – 1979
 Visions d'Anna ou Le vertige (Anna's World) – 1982
 Sommeil d'hiver (Wintersleep) – 1984
 Pierre, la guerre du printemps (Pierre) – 1984
 L'Île (The Island) – 1988
 L'Ange de la solitude (The Angel of Solitude) – 1989
 L'exilé; Les voyageurs sacrés (The Exile, and the Sacred Travellers) – 1992
 Parcours d'un écrivain: Notes américaines (American Notebooks: A Writer's Journey) – 1993
 Soifs (These Festive Nights) – 1995
 Dans la foudre et la lumière (Thunder and Light) – 2001
 Augustino et le chœur de la déstruction (Augustino and the Choir of Destruction) – 2005
 The Collected Radio Drama of Marie-Claire Blais – 2007
 Mai au bal des prédateurs (Mai at the predators' ball) – 2010
 Le jeune homme sans avenir (Nothing for you here, young man) – 2012
 Aux jardins des Acacias (The acacia gardens) – 2014
 Le festin au crépuscule (A Twilight Celebration) – 2015
 Des chants pour Angel (Songs for Angel) - 2017
 Une réunion près de la mer (2018)
 Petites Cendres ou la capture (2020)
 Un cœur habité de mille voix (2021)
 Augustino ou l'illumination (2022)

Awards 
Source:
 Prix France-Canada – 1965
 Prix Médicis – 1966
 Prix Athanase-David – 1982
 Fellow of the Royal Society of Canada – 1986
 Ludger-Duvernay Prize – 1988
 Governor General's Literary Award – 1996
 Prix d'Italie – 1999
 W. O. Mitchell Literary Prize – 2000
 Prix Prince Pierre de Monaco – 2002
 Matt Cohen Prize – 2006

References 

 "Marie-Claire Blais" in Canadian Writers, an examination of archival manuscripts, typescripts, correspondence, journals and notebooks at Library and Archives Canada
 
 Weightman, John (29 January 1960) "Fiction in France" Review section The Observer

External links 
 "Marie-Claire Blais" in The Canadian Encyclopedia
 Archives of Marie-Claire Blais (Fonds Marie-Claire Blais, R11710) are held at Library and Archives Canada 
 
 

1939 births
2021 deaths
20th-century Canadian novelists
20th-century Canadian women writers
21st-century Canadian novelists
21st-century Canadian women writers
Canadian lesbian writers
Canadian LGBT novelists
Canadian novelists in French
Canadian women novelists
Companions of the Order of Canada
Fellows of the Royal Society of Canada
French Quebecers
Governor General's Award-winning fiction writers
Canadian LGBT dramatists and playwrights
Members of the Académie royale de langue et de littérature françaises de Belgique
Officers of the National Order of Quebec
Officers of the Order of Cultural Merit (Monaco)
Prix Athanase-David winners
Prix Médicis winners
Université Laval alumni
Writers from Quebec City
Canadian expatriate writers in the United States
Lesbian dramatists and playwrights
Lesbian novelists
21st-century Canadian LGBT people
20th-century Canadian LGBT people